Women's team sprint is a track cycling event contested by teams of two women cyclists. It was introduced as an annual world championship event in 2007. It is to be added to the Olympic programme in 2012. The format consists of two rounds: in the first round, teams compete against the clock to set a qualifying time. The top four teams go through to the final round, where the first and second placed teams compete against each other in the gold medal race-off and the third and fourth teams compete against each other in the bronze medal race-off.

As of 2020, Germany have been the most successful team, having won the event five times, and placed third four times. Kaarle McCulloch, having featured in all the medalling Australian teams from 2009 up to 2020 is the most successful cyclist in the event's history,  with four gold medals – along with the German pair of Kristina Vogel and Miriam Welte. McCulloch's 8 medals also make her the most decorated cyclist in the event, an honour shared with German cyclist Miriam Welte

Medalists

Medal table

External links
Track Cycling World Championships 2016–1893 bikecult.com
World Championship, Track, Team sprint, Elite cyclingarchives.com

 
Women's team sprint
Lists of UCI Track Cycling World Championships medalists